The Universal Transverse Mercator (UTM) is a map projection system for assigning coordinates to locations on the surface of the Earth. Like the traditional method of latitude and longitude, it is a horizontal position representation, which means it ignores altitude and treats the earth as a perfect ellipsoid. However, it differs from global latitude/longitude in that it divides earth into 60 zones and projects each to the plane as a basis for its coordinates. Specifying a location means specifying the zone and the x, y coordinate in that plane. The projection from spheroid to a UTM zone is some parameterization of the transverse Mercator projection. The parameters vary by nation or region or mapping system.

Most zones in UTM span 6 degrees of longitude, and each has a designated central meridian. The scale factor at the central meridian is specified to be 0.9996 of true scale for most UTM systems in use.

History
The National Oceanic and Atmospheric Administration (NOAA) website states that the system was developed by the United States Army Corps of Engineers, starting in the early 1940s. However, a series of aerial photos found in the Bundesarchiv-Militärarchiv (the military section of the German Federal Archives) apparently dating from 1943–1944 bear the inscription UTMREF followed by grid letters and digits, and projected according to the transverse Mercator, a finding that would indicate that something called the UTM Reference system was developed in the 1942–43 time frame by the Wehrmacht. It was probably carried out by the Abteilung für Luftbildwesen (Department for Aerial Photography). From 1947 onward the US Army employed a very similar system, but with the now-standard 0.9996 scale factor at the central meridian as opposed to the German 1.0. For areas within the contiguous United States the Clarke Ellipsoid of 1866 was used. For the remaining areas of Earth, including Hawaii, the International Ellipsoid was used. The World Geodetic System WGS84 ellipsoid is now generally used to model the Earth in the UTM coordinate system, which means current UTM northing at a given point can differ up to 200 meters from the old. For different geographic regions, other datum systems can be used.

Prior to the development of the Universal Transverse Mercator coordinate system, several European nations demonstrated the utility of grid-based conformal maps by mapping their territory during the interwar period. Calculating the distance between two points on these maps could be performed more easily in the field (using the Pythagorean theorem) than was possible using the trigonometric formulas required under the graticule-based system of latitude and longitude. In the post-war years, these concepts were extended into the Universal Transverse Mercator/Universal Polar Stereographic (UTM/UPS) coordinate system, which is a global (or universal) system of grid-based maps.

The transverse Mercator projection is a variant of the Mercator projection, which was originally developed by the Flemish geographer and cartographer Gerardus Mercator, in 1570. This projection is conformal, which means it preserves angles and therefore shapes across small regions. However, it distorts distance and area.

Definitions

UTM zone

The UTM system divides the Earth into 60 zones, each 6° of longitude in width. Zone 1 covers longitude 180° to 174° W; zone numbering increases eastward to zone 60, which covers longitude 174°E to 180°. The polar regions south of 80°S and north of 84°N are excluded.

Each of the 60 zones uses a transverse Mercator projection that can map a region of large north-south extent with low distortion.  By using narrow zones of 6° of longitude (up to 668 km) in width, and reducing the scale factor along the central meridian to 0.9996 (a reduction of 1:2500), the amount of distortion is held below 1 part in 1,000 inside each zone.  Distortion of scale increases to 1.0010 at the zone boundaries along the equator.

In each zone the scale factor of the central meridian reduces the diameter of the transverse cylinder to produce a secant projection with two standard lines, or lines of true scale, about 180 km on each side of, and about parallel to, the central meridian (Arc cos 0.9996 = 1.62° at the Equator).  The scale is less than 1 inside the standard lines and greater than 1 outside them, but the overall distortion is minimized.

Overlapping grids

Distortion of scale increases in each UTM zone as the boundaries between the UTM zones are approached. However, it is often convenient or necessary to measure a series of locations on a single grid when some are located in two adjacent zones. Around the boundaries of large scale maps (1:100,000 or larger) coordinates for both adjoining UTM zones are usually printed within a minimum distance of 40 km on either side of a zone boundary. Ideally, the coordinates of each position should be measured on the grid for the zone in which they are located, but because the scale factor is still relatively small near zone boundaries, it is possible to overlap measurements into an adjoining zone for some distance when necessary.

Latitude bands
Latitude bands are not a part of UTM, but rather a part of the military grid reference system (MGRS). They are however sometimes used.

Latitude bands
Each zone is segmented into 20 latitude bands. Each latitude band is 8 degrees high, and is lettered starting from "C" at 80°S, increasing up the English alphabet until "X", omitting the letters "I" and "O" (because of their similarity to the numerals one and zero).  The last latitude band, "X", is extended an extra 4 degrees, so it ends at 84°N latitude, thus covering the northernmost land on Earth.

Latitude bands "A" and "B" do exist, theoretically, as do bands "Y" and "Z".  These cover the western and eastern sides of the Antarctic and Arctic regions respectively. A convenient mnemonic to remember is that the letter "N" is the first letter in "northern hemisphere", so any letter coming before "N" in the alphabet is in the southern hemisphere, and any letter "N" or after is in the northern hemisphere.

Notation
The combination of a zone and a latitude band defines a grid zone. The zone is always written first, followed by the latitude band. For example, (see image, top right), a position in Toronto, Ontario, Canada, would find itself in zone 17 and latitude band "T", thus the full grid zone reference is "17T". The grid zones serve to delineate irregular UTM zone boundaries. They also are an integral part of the military grid reference system.

Occasionally only N or S following the zone number is added to indicate North or South hemisphere (the easting and northing coordinates along with the zone number supplying everything necessary to geolocate a position except which hemisphere). However, this notation is ambiguous since, for instance, "50S" can mean southern hemisphere but also grid zone "50S" in the northern hemisphere.

Exceptions
These grid zones are uniform over the globe, except in two areas. On the southwest coast of Norway, grid zone 32V (9° of longitude in width) is extended further west, and grid zone 31V (3° of longitude in width) is correspondingly shrunk to cover only open water. Also, in the region around Svalbard, the four grid zones 31X (9° of longitude in width), 33X (12° of longitude in width), 35X (12° of longitude in width), and 37X (9° of longitude in width) are extended to cover what would otherwise have been covered by the seven grid zones 31X to 37X. The three grid zones 32X, 34X and 36X are not used.

Locating a position using UTM coordinates
A position on the Earth is given by the UTM zone number and band letter and the easting and northing planar coordinate pair in that zone and band.

The point of origin of each UTM zone is the intersection of the equator and the zone's central meridian. To avoid dealing with negative numbers, the central meridian of each zone is defined to coincide with  meters East. In any zone a point that has an easting of  meters is about 100 km west of the central meridian. For most such points, the true distance would be slightly more than 100 km as measured on the surface of the Earth because of the distortion of the projection. UTM eastings range from about  meters to  meters at the equator.

In the northern hemisphere positions are measured northward from zero at the equator. The maximum "northing" value is about  meters at latitude 84 degrees North, the north end of the UTM zones. The southern hemisphere's northing at the equator is set at  meters. Northings decrease southward from these  meters to about  meters at 80 degrees South, the south end of the UTM zones. Therefore, no point has a negative northing value.

Two points in Zone 17 have these coordinates, one in the northern hemisphere and one in the south; the non-ambiguous format is to specify the full zone and band, that is, "17T 630084 4833438". The provision of the latitude band along with northing supplies useful redundant information.

Simplified formulae 

These formulae are truncated version of Transverse Mercator: flattening series, which were originally derived by Johann Heinrich Louis Krüger in 1912. They are accurate to around a millimeter within  of the central meridian. Concise commentaries for their derivation have also been given.

Let's take a point of latitude  and of longitude  and compute its UTM coordinates as well as point scale factor  and meridian convergence  using a reference meridian of longitude . By convention, in the northern hemisphere  km and in the southern hemisphere  km. By convention also  and  km.

In the following formulas, the distances are in kilometers. In advance let's compute some preliminary values:

From latitude, longitude (φ, λ) to UTM coordinates (E, N) 
First let's compute some intermediate values:

The final formulae are:

From UTM coordinates (E, N, Zone, Hemi) to latitude, longitude (φ, λ) 
Note: Hemi=+1 for Northern, Hemi=-1 for Southern

First let's compute some intermediate values:

The final formulae are:

See also
Military grid reference system, a variant of UTM designed to simplify transfer of coordinates.
Modified transverse Mercator, a variation of UTM used in Canada with zones spaced 3° of longitude apart as opposed to UTM's 6°.
Transverse Mercator projection, the map projection used by UTM.
Universal Polar Stereographic coordinate system, used at the North and South poles.
Open Location Code, a hierarchical zoned system
MapCode, a hierarchical zoned system

References

Further reading

Geographic coordinate systems
Cartography
Geodesy